Rud Ab-e Sofla (also Romanized as Rūd Āb-e Soflá; also known as Rood Ab, Rūd Āb Pā’īn, and Rūd-e Āb-e Pā’īn) is a village in Garmsar Rural District, Jebalbarez-e Jonubi District, Anbarabad County, Kerman Province, Iran. At the 2006 census, its population was 325, living in 66 families, which is roughly 5 members per family.

References 

Populated places in Anbarabad County